Elizabeth Preston, Countess of Desmond and 2nd Baroness Dingwall (née Butler;  – 1628) was the only daughter of Thomas Butler, 10th Earl of Ormond, called Black Tom, a lone Protestant in his Catholic Old English family. Her marriage and inheritance were manipulated by James I to keep Black Tom's inheritance out of the hands of his Catholic successor, Walter of the beads and bring them into the hands of his Scottish favourite Richard Preston, Lord Dingwall.

Birth and origins 

Elizabeth was born about 1585, probably at the Ormond Castle, Carrick-on-Suir, Ireland. She was the only surviving child of Thomas Butler, 10th Earl of Ormond, or Black Tom, and his second wife, Elizabeth Sheffield. Her father was the 10th Earl of Ormond and head of the Butler dynasty, an Old English family that descended from Theobald Walter, who had been appointed Chief Butler of Ireland by King Henry II in 1177. Her father had been married before to Elizabeth Berkeley but that marriage had stayed childless.

Elizabeth's mother was her father's second wife, who was English, a daughter of John Sheffield, 2nd Baron Sheffield and Douglas, daughter of William Howard, 1st Baron Howard of Effingham. Elizabeth's parents were both Protestant. They had married on 9 November 1582 in London.

Elizabeth was the only surviving of three siblings, who are listed in her father's article.

Early life 
Elizabeth Butler spent some of her most formative years in England, due to her father's influential role at the court of Elizabeth of England. It is believed that she lived with her mother in Canon Row, overlooking the river Thames, before returning to live in her father's ancestral lands in Ireland in February 1593.

Little is known of Butler's experience of returning to Ireland, or how she felt about leaving her father and the English court. However, it has been documented that she believed that one day she would return to England to be married to a prominent English lord. While we can only assume about why she came to believe this, it is likely that she expected to advance her family's already high position in politics as marriages during this period often served to form political alliances. Her fortune changed after 1596 when her Cloughgrenan cousins Piers and James rebelled against the crown.

Butler's mother died in 1600.

First marriage 
As Black Thomas, Lord Ormond, had no surviving male heir, his earldom was supposed to pass to his younger brother Sir Edmund Butler of Cloughgrenan, who was therefore his heir presumptive. This succession, however, was jeopardised by the Butler rebellion of 1569, fomented by Sir Edmund and his elder sons Piers and James. Edmund, Piers, and James were attainted in 1570. They were pardoned in 1573 but joined Tyrone's Rebellion. Thomas had Piers and James killed in 1596 during this rebellion.

Edmund's third and youngest son Theobald was too young to have been implicated in the rebellion. Black Tom now planned to have him as his heir. He asked the Queen to revert his attainder, which she did. To avoid splitting his inheritance between his heir and his daughter, Black Tom planned to marry his daughter to Theobald.

Elizabeth Butler was coached by her grandmother, Douglas Sheffield, on how to behave in the presence of the queen in order to prepare for an official court appearance. On Christmas in 1602, she made her court debut at Whitehall Palace serving as her own suitor to her marriage. Her appearance reportedly made a great impression upon the Queen.

As Theobald was his daughter's first cousin, Thomas needed to ask for a royal dispensation for a marriage between cousins, which he received from the dying Queen on 22 January 1603. Soon after his accession, the new king, James I, ennobled Theobald as Viscount of Tulleophelim. Elizabeth and Theobald married in 1603 and she became Viscountess Tulleophelim.

Despite his title, Lord Tulleophelim was neither wealthy nor influential and he expected his uncle and father-in-law, Black Tom, to support the newlyweds financially. Black Tom proved not generous and Tulleophelim blamed his wife for his lack of resources. Allegedly he also abused her. Their marriage remained childless.

In 1613 Lord Tulleophelim died unexpectedly in his forties. In the confident expectation that eventually he would inherit the vast Ormond estate, he had run up debts; the payment of these now passed to her, the dowager viscountess, but without the Ormond revenues. With Theobald's death no eligible descendants of Edmund remained and Walter, the eldest son of her father's next younger brother, John Butler of Kilcash, became heir presumptive.

Second marriage and child 
Now financially destitute, The dowager viscountess Tulleophelim had to find another husband. In the autumn of 1614 she married Sir Richard Preston, Lord Dingwall, a courtier from Scotland and ambassador to Venice, despite her father's disapproval. She therefore became Lady Dingwall as baroness.

 
Elizabeth and Richard had an only child:
Elizabeth (1615–1684), who would marry James Butler, 1st Duke of Ormond

Lady Dingwall's father, Black Tom, the 10th Earl, died soon after their marriage on 22 November 1614 in Carrick-on-Suir. He was succeeded by his nephew Walter Butler, son of his brother John of Kilcash, as the 11th Earl of Ormond. Black Tom had also bequeathed almost all his possessions to his successor. Lord Dingwall challenged this inheritance in Elizabeth's name. Lord Dingwall was in good favour with King James leading to the overturning of the will through royal arbitration. On 3 October 1618 Elizabeth and her husband were awarded more than half of the Ormond estate, including Kilkenny Castle, although it was several years before they were able to take up residence there due to the obstructions of Walter's lawyers.

In July 1619 Lord Dingwall was created Baron Dunmore and 1st Earl of Desmond. In consequence she became Baroness Dunmore and Countess of Desmond. When the legal status of Kilkenny Castle was officially settled in 1623, Lady Dingwall returned to find the family home in a state of neglect and some of the furniture and family heirlooms missing.

That same year her husband supported the succession to the Ormond title in Walter's stead of a pretender calling himself Piers Butler and claiming to be a lawful son of Piers Butler, the eldest son of Sir Edmund Butler. This claim was contested by key members of the Butler family and the pretender was finally declared a fraud. Their support for this individual led to much controversy within the family and within their territories leading to Elizabeth, ultimately, leaving Ireland in August 1624 never to return.

Death and timeline 
Lady Dingwall died on 10 October 1628 in Wales and was eventually buried in Westminster Abbey. Her husband drowned at sea on the way to her funeral.

Their daughter, Elizabeth Preston, would later marry her cousin, James Butler, the future twelfth earl and first duke of Ormond.

See also 
History of Ireland (1536–1691)

Notes and references

Notes

Citations

Sources 

 
 
  – D to F (for Desmond)
  – N to R (for Ormond)
  – Scotland and Ireland
 
 
 
  – (for timeline)
  – Crawford to Falkland (for Dingwall)

Further reading 
  – (Snippet view)

1625 deaths
Elizabeth
Daughters of Irish earls
Irish countesses
Tulleophelim
People of Elizabethan Ireland
Year of birth uncertain